The 1945–46 Copa México was the 30th staging of the Copa México, the 3rd staging in the professional era.

The competition started on June 23, 1945, and concluded on July 21, 1946, with the final, in which Atlas lifted the trophy for the first time ever with a 5–4 victory over Atlante.

This edition was played by 16 teams, in a knock-out stage, in a single match.

Knock-out stage

References
Mexico - Statistics of Copa México in season 1945/1946. (RSSSF)

1945-46
1945–46 in Mexican football
1945–46 domestic association football cups